1895 Cup may refer to:

 RFL 1895 Cup
 1895 America's Cup
 1895 Currie Cup